John Leonard "Buck" Stanley (November 13, 1889 – August 13, 1940) was a pitcher in Major League Baseball. He played for the Philadelphia Phillies in 1911.

References

External links

1889 births
1940 deaths
Major League Baseball pitchers
Philadelphia Phillies players
Baseball players from Washington, D.C.
Montreal Royals players
Norfolk Tars players
Baltimore Orioles (IL) players
Johnstown Johnnies players
Lancaster Lanks players
Atlantic City Lanks players
Portland Beavers players
Sacramento Wolves players
Mission Wolves players
Portland Colts players
Ballard Pippins players
Spokane Indians players